The Haunted Man is the third studio album by English singer and songwriter Natasha Khan, known professionally as Bat for Lashes. It was released on 12 October 2012 by Parlophone. The album was preceded by the lead single "Laura", which was released on 24 July 2012.

Background
Khan stated in July 2012 that, after she returned home in March 2010 from touring in support of Two Suns (2009), she tried to rehabilitate herself to rebuild a sense of who she was without the music. In May 2010, Khan stated that although she had enough songs to put out as an album, she wanted to take more time working on new material, as she had been on tour for a long time, and found it boring to write songs about being on tour. She experienced a "profound writer's block", which led her to call Thom Yorke, lead singer of Radiohead, to ask, "What do you do when you feel like you're going to die because you can't write anything?" He advised her to draw, and subsequently Khan took life-drawing classes and a children's illustration course. Combined with intensive dance classes to boost her confidence, Khan began to feel inspiration enough to begin writing again, penning the album's opening song, "Lilies", which she said was inspired by a scene in the 1970 film Ryan's Daughter.

The album's artwork was photographed by American photographer Ryan McGinley, and features a naked Khan carrying an equally naked man on her back. Khan told NME: "I really wanted to strip things back in honour of women like Patti Smith; just these raw, honest women. I had no make-up on, it's just me and my haunted man!"

Singles
"Laura" was released as the album's lead single on 24 July 2012. The song reached number 144 on the UK Singles Chart. "All Your Gold" was released as the second single from the album on 19 September 2012, and was sent to US triple-A radio stations on 22 October. "A Wall" was released as the album's third and final single on 18 February 2013.

Critical reception

The Haunted Man received generally positive reviews from music critics. At Metacritic, which assigns a normalised rating out of 100 to reviews from mainstream publications, the album received an average score of 78, based on 36 reviews, which indicates "generally favorable reviews". Pitchforks Marc Hogan named The Haunted Man "one of the year's most beguiling albums", writing that it "sounds like effort magnificently realized. The rawness of feeling is achieved through equally raw ambition." Ben Hewitt of NME commented that "while The Haunted Man deals in less trinkets than its predecessor, it's not scant in splendour. Instead, for large swathes, it's like being plunged into a fairytale soundtracked by skin-prickling electro and populated by downtrodden sods hunting for breadcrumbs of comfort." Rolling Stones Will Hermes praised the album as Khan's "sexiest, spookiest LP", stating that "the visions here seem all her own. And they're pretty awesome." Spins Julianne Escobedo Shepherd felt that it was "strongest in its simplest moments". The Guardian critic Alexis Petridis wrote that The Haunted Man "sounds like a bold, confident album that strips away a lot of the sonic embellishments from Khan's sound", adding that "[p]erhaps it's the sound of someone who's worked out that less can sometimes be more, that not trying too hard isn't the same as not trying." Q noted a sense of clarity on the album "that comes from the sense of physical boundaries being pushed, of personal space being tested to its limits".

Heather Phares of AllMusic opined, "Focus and restraint might not sound exciting in and of themselves, but The Haunted Man is more direct than any of Bat for Lashes' previous work, and manages to keep the air of mystique around Khan that has made her one to watch and listen to since her early days." Slant Magazines Kevin Liedel viewed that "while the album's comparatively restrained arrangements occasionally wilt in the face of Khan's fierce melodrama, The Haunted Man is still a worthy, often gorgeous entry in the Bat for Lashes canon." In a mixed review, Annie Zaleski of The A.V. Club critiqued that Khan's "moody charisma and piercing vocals ensure the album is still an enjoyable listen. All the same, it's disappointing that The Haunted Mans beauty is too often only skin deep." Despite citing the album as Khan's "strongest yet", The Observers Kitty Empire felt that it "does not [...] deal the killer blow of originality that by now Khan should have in her power", concluding that "The Haunted Man is an assured and sonically seductive record—if only it didn't echo a little too often the sound of other women's work." Andy Gill of The Independent argued that "[t]here are moments on The Haunted Man when Natasha Khan's marshalled musical forces evoke exactly the right ambience for songs pivoting on the notion of renewal. But sometimes the recurrent mood of ecstatic affirmation of life that's evident in her singing can be short-changed by arrangements that fuss to no great purpose, dissipating their impact in brittle beats and pointless detail." Neil McCormick of The Daily Telegraph expressed that although the album "occasionally draw[s] blood", it "doesn't live up to its stripped and dangerous cover", adding, "For every song that opens up and invites you in to experience the startling wonders of [Khan's] private world, there's another that just hangs like a gauzy veil of unusual sounds and vague lyrics, not so much impenetrable as too insubstantial to be worth the effort of investigation."

Accolades

Commercial performance
The Haunted Man debuted at number six on the UK Albums Chart, selling 13,334 copies in its first week. The following week, it fell to number 36 with 3,991 copies sold. The album entered the Billboard 200 at number 64, becoming Khan's highest-charting album so far in the United States.

Track listing

Notes
  signifies an additional producer

Personnel
Credits adapted from the liner notes of The Haunted Man.

Musicians

 Natasha Khan – vocals ; autoharp ; bass synth ; clarinet synth, celesta, horn synth ; beat programming ; glass percussion, harp ; synths ; piano ; Omnichord, live cymbals, string arrangement ; sampler, bass piano, bells, shaker ; horn arrangement, string arrangement ; drums, programming, string arrangement, woodwind arrangement ; choral words ; bass ; string synth ; Mellotron, thumb piano, MPC programming, QY70 ; harmonium 
 David Kosten – keyboards, programming ; beats ; synths ; vocoder programming ; vocoder ; beat programming, harmonium beat 
 Dan Carey – beat programming ; drum programming ; guitar ; piano, percussion ; bass, programming ; synths ; Omnisphere ; sampler, atmospheric sounds 
 Dave Sitek – synth sound ; synths 
 Finn Vine – guitar 
 Leo Taylor – live drums ; drums 
 John Metcalfe – orchestral arrangement ; sampler ; additional programming, arrangement, conducting 
 Everton Nelson – violin leader 
 Rick Koster – violin 
 Ali Dods – violin 
 Ian Humphries – violin 
 Louisa Fuller – violin 
 Jeff Moore – violin 
 Kate Robinson – violin 
 Natalia Bonner – violin 
 Bruce White – viola 
 Nick Barr – viola 
 Vicci Wardman – viola 
 Ian Burdge – cello 
 Chris Worsey – cello 
 Sophie Harris – cello 
 Sally Herbert – arrangement ; conducting ; additional arrangement 
 Michael Spearman – drums 
 Jeremy Pritchard – bass 
 T.J. Allen – synths 
 Adrian Utley – additional synths, guitar 
 Tim Pigott-Smith – violin 
 Oli Langford – violin ; string arrangement ; additional arrangement 
 Maximillian Baillie – viola 
 Lucy Railton – cello 
 Rob Ellis – marimba, drums ; choral singer 
 Brendan Ashe – piano ; choral singer, choral arrangement 
 Justin Parker – piano 
 Richard Watkins – French horn 
 Dan Newell – trumpet 
 Mike Kearsey – trombone 
 Oren Marshall – tuba 
 Richard Pryce – double bass 
 Steve Rossell – double bass 
 Eliza Marshall – bass flute ; flute 
 Sarah Jones – backing vocals 
 Ben Christophers – choral singer ; choral sampler, piano, synths 
 Chris Vatalaro – timpani 
 Beck Hansen – guitar, synths, beat programming, drum machine 
 Charlotte Hatherley – additional arrangement 
 Tariq Khan – synths 
 James Ford – synths, programming

Technical

 Natasha Khan – production
 David Kosten – production ; engineering ; additional production ; additional engineering ; mixing 
 Dan Carey – mixing ; mix engineering ; production, engineering 
 Alexis Smith – mix engineering ; engineering 
 Sam Okell – string recording, string engineering ; horn recording, horn engineering 
 Isabel Seeliger-Morley – mix engineering assistance 
 Tom Loffman – additional engineering 
 Mo Hausler – additional engineering ; engineering 
 Drew Smith – additional engineering ; engineering assistance 
 Rob Ellis – additional production ; additional engineering on choral arrangement 
 Kato Ådland – additional engineering ; additional engineering on choral arrangement 
 Justin Parker – vocal recording, vocal production 
 Dean Nelson – additional engineering 
 Cole Marsden – additional engineering 
 Cassidy Turbin – additional engineering 
 John Davis – mastering

Artwork
 Natasha Khan – concept, design
 Ryan McGinley – photography
 Dan Sanders – photographic commissioning
 Richard Welland – design
 Zosienka – sketches

Charts

Certifications and sales

Release history

Notes

References

2012 albums
Albums produced by Dan Carey (record producer)
Bat for Lashes albums
Capitol Records albums
Parlophone albums